The Sonic the Hedgehog video game franchise began in 1991 with the game Sonic the Hedgehog for the Sega Genesis, which pitted a blue anthropomorphic hedgehog named Sonic against a rotund male human villain named Doctor Eggman (or Doctor Ivo Robotnik). The sequel, Sonic 2, gave Sonic a fox friend named Tails. Sonic CD introduced Amy Rose, a female hedgehog with a persistent crush on Sonic. Sonic 3 introduced Knuckles the Echidna, Sonic's rival and later, friend. All five of these have remained major characters and appeared in dozens of games.

The series has introduced dozens of additional recurring characters over the years. These have ranged from anthropomorphic animal characters like Shadow the Hedgehog and Cream the Rabbit to robots created by Eggman like Metal Sonic and E-123 Omega, as well as human characters like Eggman's grandfather Gerald Robotnik. The series features three fictional species: Chao, which have usually functioned as digital pets and minor gameplay and plot elements; Wisps, which have been used as power-ups; and Koco, which when collected grant new abilities for Sonic, among other things.

The Sonic games keep a separate continuity from the Sonic the Hedgehog comics published by Archie Comics and other Sonic media and, as a result, feature a distinct yet overlapping array of many characters.

Characters

Sonic the Hedgehog

 trademarked Sonic The Hedgehog,<ref name="sonic's middle name">{{cite book|last=Kent|first=Steven|author-link=Steven L. Kent|title=The Ultimate History of Video Games: The Story Behind the Craze that Touched our Lives and Changed the World|publisher=Prima Publishing|location=Roseville, California|isbn=0-7615-3643-4|chapter=Chapter 23|year=2001|quote=the "t" in Sonic the Hedgehog is capitalized not lower case. Sega marketing wizard Al Nilsen had the "The" registered as Sonic's middle name.|page=428}}</ref> is a blue anthropomorphic hedgehog and the main protagonist of the series. Developed as a replacement for their existing Alex Kidd mascot, as well as Sega's response to Mario, his first appearance was in the arcade game Rad Mobile as a cameo, before making his official debut in Sonic the Hedgehog (1991). Sonic's greatest ability is his running speed, and he is known as the world's fastest hedgehog. Using the power of the seven Chaos Emeralds, he becomes Super Sonic and can achieve even greater speeds.

Doctor Eggman

 better known by his alias  is a human mad scientist and the main antagonist of the series. Debuting in the first game of the series, Sonic the Hedgehog, he was shown attempting to collect the Chaos Emeralds and turn all of the animals inhabiting the land into robots. He is a self-proclaimed or certifiable genius with an IQ of 300.Sega (2004). Sonic Heroes instruction manual, pp. 14 His fondness for mechas has made him a renowned authority on robotics. Ultimately, Eggman's goal is to conquer the world and create his ultimate utopia, Eggmanland, alternatively known as the Eggman Empire and Robotnikland.

When Sega had petitioned its research and development department to create a character who would replace Alex Kidd as its company mascot, a caricature of U.S. President Theodore Roosevelt was among the proposed designs. It lost to Sonic the Hedgehog, but the design was kept for the basis for Dr. Eggman instead.

Miles "Tails" Prower

 better known by his nickname,  is a two-tailed fox who is Sonic's best friend and sidekick. His name is a pun on "miles per hour". He can use his tails to propel himself into the air like a helicopter for a limited time. Yasushi Yamaguchi, originally the main artist and zone designer for Sega's Sonic Team, designed Tails for an internal competition for a sidekick to Sonic. His first appearance was in Sonic 2 for the Game Gear, where he was kidnapped by Doctor Robotnik for a "hefty" ransom. He was first made playable in the Genesis version of Sonic the Hedgehog 2. Tails has appeared in almost every Sonic game since his first appearance. Tails starred in two solo spin-off games for the Sega Game Gear in 1995 – Tails' Skypatrol, and Tails Adventure. Frequently portrayed as a sweet-natured and humble fox, Tails used to be picked on because of his twin tails, before he met Sonic. Tails has a very high IQ and excellent mechanical skills.

Amy Rose

Voiced by:
English: Jennifer Douillard (1999–2004), Lisa Ortiz (2003–2010), Cindy Robinson (2010–present),Shannon Chan-Kent (Sonic Prime)Japanese: Taeko Kawata
 is a pink hedgehog and Sonic's self-proclaimed girlfriend, who is an energetic tomboy. Amy was created by Kazuyuki Hoshino for Sonic the Hedgehog CD (1993), although she appeared Kenji Terada's Sonic the Hedgehog manga a year before. Hoshino created her in-game graphics, with many staff members contributing ideas to her design. Her headband and trainer shoes reflected Sonic CD director Naoto Ohshima's tastes, and her mannerisms reflected the traits Hoshino looked for in women at the time. Her fur color was red at first, and her skirt orange. The character had two other names in game previews: Rosy the Rascal and Princess Sally (a character in the Sonic the Hedgehog TV series and comics). Amy received her present design, with a red dress and boots, in Sonic Adventure (1998), courtesy of designer Yuji Uekawa.
 
In the games, Amy is depicted as driven and competitive. She spends much of her time following Sonic to get his attention or make sure he is safe while demonstrating her affection. Series co-creator Yuji Naka said that Amy was designed "to always chase Sonic", and has made it her life goal to one day marry him. Not possessing the speed or strength of the other characters, Amy uses a hammer to defend herself instead. In Sonic CD, Metal Sonic kidnaps Amy and Sonic must rescue her. When he does, Amy kisses him. Amy's first appearance in a Sonic platformer as a playable character was in Sonic Adventure; she is playable in Sonic Heroes (2003) and Sonic the Hedgehog (2006), and appears as a non-player character in games such as Sonic Unleashed (2008).

While some journalists have called Amy cute and powerful, others find her annoying. Justin Towell of GamesRadar+ and writers from Mean Machines expressed general displeasure at her introduction in Sonic CD. Additionally, some have criticized developers' treatment of Amy as a female character and analyzed her implications on gender representation in video games. The Electronic Gaming Monthly staff found her pink coloring and tendency to run from danger to be stereotypical and common in Japanese-created female characters, while feminist blogger Anita Sarkeesian cites Amy as an example of the "Ms. Male Character" trope, in which female characters in games with male protagonists often resemble those protagonists, but with stereotypically feminine features added. Despite this, Amy is one of the series' most popular characters, coming in fifth place in a Japanese popularity poll in 2006. Her likeness has been used in Sonic merchandise, and she appears in the television adaptations Sonic X (2003–2006) and Sonic Boom (2014–2017).

Metal Sonic
 is an evil robotic version of Sonic created by Dr. Robotnik. He first appears in Sonic the Hedgehog CD. He is given orders to go back in time and change the past so that Dr. Eggman can rule the future. Sonic must race him in Stardust Speedway to free Amy Rose. He is severely wounded when he crashes and falls, but is rejuvenated by Robotnik in Sonic the Hedgehog 4: Episode II, only to be defeated again in a similar style. He returns in Knuckles' Chaotix, where he attempts to obtain the Chaos Rings, but he is stopped by the Chaotix. Metal Sonic notably acted as the main antagonist in Sonic Heroes, appearing in a new form as Neo Metal Sonic before transforming into the game's final boss, the Metal Overlord. 

Upon being defeated by Super Sonic, Tails, and Knuckles, he reverts to his traditional appearance. He appears as the main antagonist in the Sonic the Hedgehog (OVA), where Eggman records Sonic's abilities and uploads them to Metal Sonic, who proceeds in attempting to destroy the world before being tossed into lava by Sonic. Metal Sonic appears as a bonus playable character in Sonic Rivals, reprogrammed to aid Eggman Nega in his attempt to take over the world. He returns as a playable character in Sonic Rivals 2, under orders from Eggman to aid Shadow in stopping Eggman Nega's plans. 

In Sonic Free Riders, Metal Sonic is a playable character and the final opponent in the game's story mode. In Sonic Generations, he appears in his classic form as a rival boss, battling Classic Sonic in Stardust Speedway before ultimately being destroyed. Metal Sonic returns as a boss character in Sonic Boom: Rise of Lyric and Sonic Boom: Shattered Crystal. He appears in the Sonic Boom episode, "It Wasn't Me, It Was the One-Armed Hedgehog". Metal Sonic appears as a boss in the Sonic story mode of Lego Dimensions.

Metal Sonic appeared as a playable character in the multiplayer mode of Sonic Adventure 2: Battle, as well as Sonic & Sega All-Stars Racing, Sonic & All-Stars Racing Transformed, and all the Mario & Sonic titles beginning with Mario & Sonic at the Olympic Winter Games. Collecting all the emblems in Sonic Adventure DX: Director's Cut unlocks Metal Sonic as a bonus playable character in Sonic's stages, and purchasing both episodes of Sonic the Hedgehog 4 unlocks bonus levels in which Metal Sonic is playable.

He possesses great strength, including a laser cannon, a jet engine and a force field device he can use to protect himself from projectiles and certain attacks. He usually only communicates with a series of electronic noises. The only notable time Metal Sonic was able to talk was in Sonic Heroes in which he was voiced by Jun'ichi Kanemaru in Japanese and Ryan Drummond in English.

GameDaily placed Metal Sonic 13th on their "Top 25 Video Game Robots" list, describing him as Dr. Robotnik's "greatest creation" and praising the strength of his abilities.

Knuckles the Echidna

 is a red echidna and Sonic's friendly rival. First introduced in the Genesis game Sonic the Hedgehog 3, Knuckles lives on Angel Island, which hovers in the sky due to the power of the Master Emerald. As the last surviving member of the Echidna people who once inhabited the island, his duty is to guard the Master Emerald.

During conception of Sonic the Hedgehog 3, the development team wanted to create a new rival for Sonic. The final design of Knuckles was the result of dozens of possible designs inspired by numerous different animals. A character with many different abilities and skills, he is physically one of the strongest characters of the Sonic series. His strength and mastery of martial arts, specialising in punches, enables him to perform feats such as shattering boulders with his fists, while he can trap air underneath his dreadlocks in order to glide for short distances.

Fang the Sniper

 initially known as Nack the Weasel in English localizations, is a purple jerboa/wolf hybrid that first appeared in the Game Gear video game Sonic the Hedgehog: Triple Trouble in 1994. His character is a treasure hunter in search of the Chaos Emeralds; however he does not know of their true power and merely wants to sell them for his own profit. He is a slick, sneaky, and mischievous character who will steal the Emeralds for an easier job. Fang tries hard to outwit others, but is held back by his clumsiness and often fails.

Outside of Triple Trouble, Fang has had playable roles in Sonic Drift 2 and Sonic the Fighters in 1995 and 1996, and had been planned to be in the cancelled Sonic Xtreme. He has not had any significant roles since however, though he did make a cameo appearance on an in-game poster in 2011's Sonic Generations, and as an illusion during the boss fight with Heavy Magician in Sonic Mania in 2017.

Chaotix
The Chaotix are a group of initially four characters who debuted in the game Knuckles' Chaotix as the main characters, later forming their own detective agency in Sonic Heroes where only three of them (Vector, Espio and Charmy respectively) returned, after the three were redesigned and rebooted into essentially new characters. IGN described the characters as "charming" and noted that they were introduced before fans became weary of all the new characters in the series.

Vector the Crocodile

Voiced by:
English: Marc Biagi (2004), Carter Cathcart (2004–2006), Dan Green (2007–2010), Keith Silverstein (2010–present)Japanese: Kenta Miyake
 is a large crocodile who is the "head honcho" and brains of the Chaotix Detective Agency. Divided between being both "bossy" and "easy-going", his rough speech and outward appearance mask his clear reasoning and ability to resolve cases. For the right price he will take on most jobs, unless they involve doing something immoral. Vector has a strong sense of justice and kindness, despite his argumentativeness. He often does unpaid work due to his charitable nature, such as finding a lost child or taking up meager chases for children. This leaves the agency constantly short on money. Vector hates having to work for the landlord, but he enjoys singing, and his trademark accessory is a set of headphones. He is physically very strong and his powerful jaws are a formidable weapon.

Vector was, originally, supposed to be in the sound test of the first Sonic the Hedgehog game, but he along with the feature itself, was removed prior to its release. Vector then made his official debut was in the video game Knuckles' Chaotix. And in 2003, he was part of Team Chaotix in Sonic Heroes and is featured in Shadow the Hedgehog, Sonic Generations, Sonic Forces and several other games (alongside both Espio and Charmy in said games). In all instalments of Mario & Sonic at the Olympic Games, he is a playable athlete. He has also been playable in other spinoff titles such as Sonic Free Riders and Team Sonic Racing, and mobile games like Sonic Forces: Speed Battle and Sonic Dash. 

Vector was also the only 'Modern exclusive' character (besides Shadow) to appear in the Sonic Boom franchise, making his debut into the sub-franchise in the season two episode; Vector Detector. He later made a few cameo appearances before the show's end. Like the other game characters, he was redesigned for the series, sporting an arm tattoo and a leather jacket in place of his traditional headphones. In 2021, he was later added as a playable character in the tie-in mobile game; Sonic Dash 2: Sonic Boom.

Espio the Chameleon

Voiced by:
English: Bill Corkery (2004), David Wills (2005–2010), Troy Baker (2010–2016), Matthew Mercer (2016–present)Japanese: Yuuki Masuda
 is a chameleon who is a ninja warrior. He is described as the "opinionated number one" of the Chaotix, also being the calmest. He has a "militaristic discipline" while being quiet and laid back. Confident in his skills, opinionated and self-obsessed, he revels in training and self-discipline. He is not concerned by danger, and often yearns to face it in order to use his ninja skills. With his extensive training in ninjutsu and an ability to turn himself invisible, he is able to move around unnoticed. However, a blunder like a sneeze could cause him to inadvertently become visible.

Espio's debut was in the video game Knuckles' Chaotix. In the game, his color subtly changes while he moves to demonstrate the technical capabilities of the Sega 32X console. Espio was incorporated into Sonic Heroes as part of a move to reintroduce neglected characters, and because the development team considered him to have a unique, interesting personality. He was the designated "speed" character in Sonic Heroes while teammates Vector the Crocodile and Charmy Bee respectively represented "power" and "flight". Espio was added to Shadow the Hedgehog and Sonic Rivals 2 to help "round out our cast of characters", and because designer Takashi Iizuka appreciated the character's "stealthy agility". Espio appeared as a playable character in the arcade fighting game Sonic the Fighters, and has also appeared in all installments of Mario & Sonic at the Olympic Games as the referee in various events.

Charmy Bee

Voiced by:
English: Amy Birnbaum (2003–2010), Colleen O'Shaughnessey (2010–present)Japanese: Yoko Teppouzuka
 is a bee who is the "scatter-brained funny-kid" of the Chaotix. He is cheerful, curious, playful, careless, and greatly energetic, often talking about things no one else cares about. Charmy's fooling around makes the rest of the detective agency staff look professional, and he is generally seen as a "cute mascot". Despite an innocent, good-natured and light-hearted personality, he uses his stinger on rare occasions where he gets angry. In addition to being a playable character in Sonic Heroes and Shadow the Hedgehog, he made cameos in all the Mario & Sonic at the Olympic Games installments as a referee.

Mighty the Armadillo
 is a black and red armadillo who debuted in the arcade game SegaSonic the Hedgehog and later appeared in the 32X game Knuckles' Chaotix. The character is described as a traveler who loves nature and desires to see every place. Mighty hates to see weaknesses in others and detests violence. He prefers to be gentle but undergoes a drastic change and is capable when needed. Mighty's only appearance as part of the Chaotix was in Knuckles Chaotix, and was absent when the rest of the group was reintroduced into the series with Sonic Heroes in 2003. 

His long period of absence was alluded to in Sonic Generations, in which he is shown on a missing persons poster alongside fellow SegaSonic character Ray the Flying Squirrel. Both Mighty and Ray appeared as playable characters in the Sonic Mania expansion Sonic Mania Plus, as well as appearing in the accompanying web series Sonic Mania Adventures.

Ray the Flying Squirrel
 is a yellow flying squirrel who debuted in the arcade game SegaSonic the Hedgehog. While he can run as fast as Sonic, Ray can also climb trees and glide.

His long period of absence was alluded to in Sonic Generations, in which he is shown on a missing persons poster during the City Escape level alongside fellow SegaSonic character Mighty the Armadillo. Both Ray and Mighty appeared as playable characters in the Sonic Mania expansion Sonic Mania Plus, as well as appearing in the accompanying web series Sonic Mania Adventures.

Big the Cat

Voiced by:
English: Jon St. John (1999–2003), Oliver Wyman (2003–2010, 2016), Kyle Hebert (2010–present)Japanese: Takashi Nagasako (2003–present)
 first appeared in the 1998 Dreamcast game Sonic Adventure, where he was placed to justify the presence of a fishing rod in the game, although he was conceived beforehand. Big is a large, purple anthropomorphic cat, who is depicted as—while unintelligent—sweet, easygoing, and physically strong.Sonic Heroes (GameCube) instruction manual, p. 11.

In Sonic Adventure, Big's story involves fishing his frog friend  out of various bodies of water after Froggy swallows a Chaos Emerald and part of the tail of Chaos, the game's antagonist. In Sonic Heroes, Big teams up with Amy Rose and Cream the Rabbit to search for Froggy and a lost Chao creature called Chocola. He is a more minor playable character in other Sonic games, like Sonic Chronicles: The Dark Brotherhood and Sonic & Sega All-Stars Racing, and a non-player character in titles such as the Nintendo DS version of Sonic Colors. Reflecting the story of Adventure, Big appears in the Sonic X anime and the Sonic the Hedgehog comics.

Big has been derided by the video game press and fanbase for his obesity, low intelligence, one-dimensional development and uselessness within his games; he has appeared on several lists of the worst video game characters of all time and within the Sonic cast. Due to his poor reception and apparent uselessness, Sonic Team claimed they would be retiring the character from appearing in future games in 2012, although head Takashi Iizuka has since stated that a game starring Big is a possibility. Despite this statement, Big has continued to appear in other titles, including Sonic Runners, Lego Dimensions, Team Sonic Racing, and Sonic Frontiers.

Chaos

 is a Chao mutated by the Chaos Emeralds that acts as a guardian for its species, protects the Master Emerald, and provides clear water around its altar. It is a water-like being that can easily manipulate its body. Without any Chaos Emeralds, it is known as "Chaos Zero", but with each Emerald it absorbs, it transforms into a more powerful form, eventually becoming "Perfect Chaos" with all 7 Emeralds.

Its first appearance is in Sonic Adventure, where Dr. Eggman attempts to use it to conquer the world. Chaos tracks down the emeralds, becomes "Perfect Chaos", and floods all of Station Square, but is ultimately defeated by Super Sonic. It reappears in Sonic Adventure 2 as a bonus multiplayer character, in Sonic Battle as a playable fighter, and in Mario & Sonic at the Olympic Winter Games as an ice version of Perfect Chaos. He reappears in his perfect form in Sonic Generations as a boss where he has a new look with green teeth and dark blue reptilian skin for the upper half of his body. This was supposed to be how he always looked, but the technology of the Dreamcast at the time made this look impossible. Chaos appears as the final boss in the Sonic the Hedgehog pack of Lego Dimensions.

E-100 Series
The E-100 Series is a group of robots created by Doctor Eggman, who uses them in his quest to conquer the world; however, some of their members have since gone rogue.

E-100 Alpha
 better known as Zero, is the first of the E-100 series and considered the prototype of the line. He was created by Dr. Eggman and ordered to capture the Chaos Emerald from Amy Rose's Flicky friend, Birdie. He first appeared in Sonic Adventure as the main antagonist in Amy's story, where he repeatedly tries to capture Birdie. At the end of Amy's story, she destroys him. In Sonic Advance 2, he appears in special stages, trying to prevent players from getting the seven Chaos Emeralds.

E-102 Gamma

Voiced by:
English: Steve BroadieJapanese: Joji Nakata
 also primarily appears in Sonic Adventure. He is a red, bulky robot with a powerful gun built into his arm. Gamma turns against his master after a heartfelt conversation with Amy Rose, who becomes his friend, and destroys the other E-100 Series robots to free the trapped animals inside them before ultimately doing the same to himself. He offers shoot-'em-up gameplay to a largely platforming-focused game. Gamma later made a spiritual return in the form of Chaos Gamma, who appeared as a playable character in Sonic Battle. He has garnered mixed comments from critics. While Xbox World generally commended his story, others criticized the slow and repetitive nature of his gameplay.

E-123 Omega

Voiced by:
English: Jon St. John (2003), Maddie Blaustein (2006–2009), Vic Mignogna (2010–2017), Aaron LaPlante (2019–present)Japanese: Taiten Kusunoki
 first appears in Sonic Heroes, Eggman seals Omega within an abandoned base, along with Shadow, until Rouge the Bat releases Shadow from his stasis pod, accidentally reactivating Omega. Omega expresses a deep hatred for Eggman due to the latter locking him up in stasis for an extended period of time. Omega decides to team up with the other two in order to obtain revenge on Eggman and prove that he is the most powerful robot of all. He returns with the same goal in Shadow the Hedgehog, and teams up with Shadow in certain levels to destroy Eggman's robots. 

During Sonic the Hedgehog 2006, he is playable after Rouge orders him to support Shadow many years in the future. He is also one of the secret unlockable characters in Sonic Chronicles: The Dark Brotherhood. He also appeared in the DS version of Sonic Colors where he challenges Sonic to perform a mission, and reveals to Sonic the location of Eggman's base in the Asteroid Coaster world. In Sonic Forces, Omega is severely damaged by Infinite, but is repaired by Tails and becomes a member of the Resistance. Omega has appeared in Mario & Sonic at the Olympic Winter Games as a rival in speed skating and intense short track and in Mario & Sonic at the London 2012 Olympic Games as a rival in the 100m Sprint. Omega appears as a playable racer in Team Sonic Racing.

Omega has an array of destructive weapons concealed in his arms, including machine guns, flamethrowers, missile launchers, beam cannons and rocket-propelled drills. He can retract his hands in order to attach a spinning Shadow and Rouge in their place, either using the two as melee weapons or firing them. Omega has seen negative reception. Eurogamer staff writer Tom Bramwell called Omega a "lesser" character among the Heroes cast. An Electronic Gaming Monthly preview of Heroes referred to him as an imitation of the T-1000s from the film Terminator 2: Judgment Day. However, Jeremy Dunham from IGN called Omega a "supreme machine".

Omochao

Voiced by:
English: Lani Minella (2001–2004), Erica Lindbeck (2019–present)Japanese: Etsuko Kozakura
 is a robot Chao with a propeller on its head. Omochao was introduced in Sonic Adventure as part of the Chao Races, and it later appeared in Sonic Adventure 2, where it serves as an in-game manual to teach players how to play the game. It has filled a similar tutorial role in other games such as Sonic Heroes, Sonic Advance 3, Sonic Generations, and Lego Dimensions. The character has made other sporadic appearances throughout the series, including as a type of gun in Shadow the Hedgehog, a referee in Sonic Riders, a collectible card and referee in Sonic Rivals 2, a referee in Mario & Sonic at the Olympic Games, a supporting character in multiplayer of Sonic and the Secret Rings, and the host of the World Grand Prix in Sonic Free Riders. Its only playable appearance is as one of a group of playable chao in Team Sonic Racing.

Tikal the Echidna

Voiced by:
English: Elara DistlerJapanese: Kaori Asoh
She first appears in Sonic Adventure and returns in Sonic Adventure 2. Thousands of years before the main events of the series, she opposes her father's power-hungry ways of invading other countries. She eventually comes into contact with Chaos and a group of Chao at the shrine of the Master Emerald, who accept her due to her friendliness to them. She tries to reason with him about raiding the shrine for the emeralds, but he, hesitated by what she said to him, briefly snaps at her and orders the Knuckles Clan to attack. When the Clan does as it is told, they ran over Tikal and the Chao, which angers Chaos, as he punishes Pachacamac and the Knuckles Clan for what they did to Tikal and the Chao, by destroying them, absorbing the negative power of the emeralds. 

After that, Tikal tells the Master Emerald to stop Chaos, as it seals her inside itself. Several thousand years later, Doctor Eggman shatters the Master Emerald and awakens the angry Chaos and Tikal's spirit. Tikal helps the main characters defeat Chaos and then leaves with it. Tikal appears in Sonic Advance and Sonic Advance 2 in a Chao minigame, and makes a cameo appearance on the Angel Island board of Sonic Pinball Party. In both Sonic Rivals and Sonic Rivals 2, she appears on a variety of collectible cards. In Mario & Sonic at the London 2012 Olympic Games and Mario & Sonic at the Sochi 2014 Olympic Winter Games, she appears as an unlockable Mii costume. In Super Smash Bros. Brawl, she is a collectable sticker. Tikal appears as a playable character in Sonic Runners and is mentioned in Sonic Frontiers.

Shadow the Hedgehog

 is an artificially created life form in the design of a black and red male hedgehog, similar to Sonic. His trademark hover skates propel him at extreme speeds that rival those of Sonic.

According to official profiles, Shadow was created 50 years ago by Professor Gerald Robotnik as the "Ultimate Life Form", which is ageless and immortal. Sharp witted and seemingly always on the edge, once he has set himself to a goal, he will do whatever it takes to accomplish it, regardless of any danger. After the trauma of the death of his only friend, Maria Robotnik, Shadow strives to fulfill his purpose and keep the promise he made to her. Although his relationship with Sonic seems to have developed from antagonistic to friendly rivalry, animosity from not understanding their different mindsets still occurs.

However, Shadow shares a lot of similarities with Sonic. He can perform spin attacks common to Sonic, which are a variation on the tendency for hedgehogs to roll into tight balls for protection. Additionally, with the power of a Chaos Emerald, Shadow can warp time and space with Chaos Control. Shadow is also able to use a variety of other Chaos powers, such as "Chaos Spear" and "Chaos Blast".

Using the power of the seven Chaos Emeralds, Shadow uses his super transformation to transform into Super Shadow and gains new abilities of flight and near invulnerability, with normal abilities of speed and enhanced Chaos powers.

Rouge the Bat

Voiced by:
English: Lani Minella (2001–2004), Kathleen Delaney (2005–2010), Karen Strassman (2010–present)Japanese: Rumi Ochiai
 is a white, anthropomorphic bat who made her first appearance in Sonic Adventure 2 in 2001, and who has been featured in most games since. She has appeared in every mainline game and most spin-off games alongside Shadow (excluding the Storybook spin-off games). She is depicted as a professional treasure hunter devoted to the pursuit of jewels, calling herself the "World's Greatest Treasure Hunter". She has a tendency to ignore abstract morality or manners for potential profit; her "feminine charm" makes her appear careless, but she is actually scheming and manipulative. Additionally, she serves as a part-time spy for the government, and is a competent fighter. She battles using kicks, especially her signature "Screw Kick," and she can fly using her wings.

Despite receiving a polarized reception with critics initially, Rouge is one of the series' most popular characters, coming in tenth place in a Japanese popularity poll in 2006. Marking her as the second most popular female character in the franchise, next to Amy Rose. She has been a major character in two television adaptions; Sonic X (2003–2006) and Sonic Prime (2022–present).

Professor Gerald Robotnik

Voiced by:
English: Mike Pollock (2003–2005)
Japanese: Chikao Otsuka (2001–2005)
 is the grandfather of Maria Robotnik and Dr. Ivo "Eggman" Robotnik. Fifty years before the main series, he attempted to create the "Ultimate Life Form" under the funding of the United Federation, hoping that it can help cure Maria's illness. However, when Maria was killed during a G.U.N. raid, Gerald, fueled by anger over his granddaughter's death and becoming resentful of humanity's increasingly callous nature, infiltrated Project ARK in order to combine the space station with the Chaos Emeralds and turn it into a doomsday weapon. He appears in Sonic Adventure 2 and Shadow the Hedgehog.

Maria Robotnik

Voiced by:
English: Moriah Angeline (2001)Japanese: Yuri Shiratori
 is a character that appears mostly in flashbacks in Sonic Adventure 2 and Shadow the Hedgehog. She is the granddaughter of Professor Gerald Robotnik, and is the cousin of Dr. Ivo "Eggman" Robotnik. Maria suffers from the illness known as "NIDS" (Neuro-Immuno Deficiency Syndrome), which was incurable at the time. Gerald takes on Project Shadow in order to save her life. Soon after Shadow is created, the two bond deeply, though it is short-lived as the government organization "G.U.N." soon raids the ARK, fatally shooting Maria. Before she dies, she encases Shadow in an escape pod and asks him to bring hope to humanity and give humans a chance to be happy. This experience with Maria scars Shadow for life, but ultimately his determination to keep his promise to her leads him to team up with Sonic and save the Earth multiple times.

Maria's first and only playable appearance is in Shadow the Hedgehog, where she can be controlled as a partner character by a second player during specific in-game missions.

Cream the Rabbit and Cheese

Voiced by:
English: Rebecca Honig (2003–2009), Michelle Ruff (2010–present)Japanese: Sayaka Aoki

 is a peach-colored rabbit with a constant companion named  a blue Chao with a red bow-tie. Their names were based on "cream cheese". Cream is portrayed as being naive because of being brought up like a princess by her mother, Vanilla. She always politely minds her manners but sometimes acts childishly. Cream can achieve flight for short periods of time by flapping her two large ears, while Cheese often attacks on Cream's behalf by ramming into her adversaries.

Cream first appeared as a playable character in Sonic Advance 2. She returned in Sonic Heroes as part of "Team Rose", working together with Amy Rose and Big the Cat to defeat Metal Sonic, and then again for Sonic Advance 3.

Since her first trio of games, she has been relegated to being an extra playable character in Sonic spinoffs and multiplayer games. She is a playable character in the Sonic and the Secret Rings multiplayer mode, a playable fighter within Sonic Battle, a secret unlockable party member in Sonic Chronicles: The Dark Brotherhood and a playable racer in Sonic Riders, Sonic Riders: Zero Gravity, and Sonic Free Riders.

Cream has received mostly negative opinions from the video game press. Thomas East of Official Nintendo Magazine ranked her as the fifth worst Sonic character, criticizing various aspects of her like her high-pitched voice, repetitious speech in Sonic Heroes, "ridiculous smile", and single eyelash on each eye. Christian Nutt of GameSpy singled her out as one of the negative features of Sonic Advance 2, calling her "corny" and "dopey-looking". 

GamesRadar writer Jim Sterling ranked her as their second worst, stating that she "represents perhaps everything that's wrong with Sonic the Hedgehog characters", particularly finding her name to be random. Similarly, Tom Bramwell of Eurogamer exclaimed "oh God" at her and Cheese's names. David Houghton of GamesRadar ranked her name as one of the 25 worst among all video game characters, seeing a double entendre in the word "cream". In contrast, Xbox Worlds review of Heroes stated that "we love Cream" and called her "the best new Sonic character since Tails." The character is also highly regarded in Japan, where she entered the top ten in a 2006 popularity poll.

Blaze the Cat

Voiced by:
English: Erica Schroeder (2005–2010), Laura Bailey (2010–2019), Erica Lindbeck (2019–present)Japanese: Nao Takamori
 is a purple cat princess from an alternate dimension. She has been appointed as guardian of the Sol Emeralds, her dimension's version of the Chaos Emeralds, making her role similar to that of Knuckles the Echidna. She is portrayed as calm and levelheaded, hiding her true feelings. She is sometimes "bogged down" by her own strict discipline and devotion to her position, making her appear withdrawn. Blaze can control fire, but wears a cape to conceal it as she was teased about her pyrokinetic abilities when she was young. Using the Sol Emeralds, she transforms into Burning Blaze. Blaze wears a purple dress and white tights with pink high heels and a yellow necklace.

Blaze debuted in Sonic Rush as a playable character along with Sonic. She arrives in Sonic's dimension from another dimension along with the Sol Emeralds. While searching for the Emeralds, she befriends Sonic and Cream and helps them stop Dr. Eggman and Eggman Nega before returning to her dimension. She reappears in Sonic the Hedgehog as Silver the Hedgehog's friend during the future of Sonic's dimension. The two attempt to fix their ruined future world by traveling back in time. Blaze ends up sacrificing her life to seal Iblis, the fiery monster that has destroyed their world, inside herself, but is brought back to life at the end of the game when Sonic destroyed Iblis in his own time period. She appeared again as the main character in Sonic Rush Adventure, where Sonic and Tails are transported to her dimension and help her retrieve the "Jeweled Scepter".

Since her first trio of games, she has been relegated to being an extra playable character in Sonic spinoffs and multiplayer games. She is an unlockable multiplayer character in the Sonic and the Secret Rings and Sonic and the Black Knight, a playable racer in Sonic Riders: Zero Gravity, Sonic Free Riders and Team Sonic Racing, and a playable athlete in all five Mario & Sonic at the Olympics games. She appears together with Silver in Sonic Colors DS in several cutscenes and missions. She is also mentioned in Sonic Frontiers.

Blaze has been mostly well-received by critics. IGN remarked upon seeing her at TGS 2005 that she "easily earned her place in the team" amidst unremarkable secondary characters. Her gameplay has been praised as "fast-moving and fun" as opposed to slower characters introduced earlier in the series, but criticized for its resemblance to that of Sonic. Blaze has been called "a nice addition to Sonic's cast" and "one of the more complex, multifaceted characters in the Sonic canon".

Eggman Nega
Voiced by:
English: Mike PollockJapanese: Chikao Otsuka (2005–2020)
 (voiced by Mike Pollock in English and Chikao Ohtsuka in Japanese) is Eggman's descendant from 200 years in the future, first introduced in Sonic Rush as the arch-enemy of Blaze the Cat and later Silver the Hedgehog. He is known to cause trouble not only through time travel, but through inter-dimensional travel as well. Although his outward appearance resembles that of Doctor Eggman, his personality is different. He is heartless and calculating, but maintains polite speech and manners. His exact role in the overall series varies; in the Sonic Rush series, he works alongside the original Eggman as a team.

Babylon Rogues
The Babylon Rogues are a group of avian thieves. They have only appeared collectively in the Sonic Riders sub-series. Producer Takashi Yuda considered them best-suited for Sonic series racing games, and noted in a 2006 interview that Sonic characters are usually designed with one specific storyline in mind.

The Rogues have received predominantly negative comments from gaming journalists. Alex Navarro and Joe Dodson of GameSpot separately criticized their clichéd backstory, as did Eurogamer's Tom Bramwell. IGN's Jack DeVries specifically called Jet a "jerk" and stated that his voice is annoying, especially in Free Riders.

Jet the Hawk
Voiced by:
English: Jason Griffith (2006–2009), Michael Yurchak (2010–present)Japanese: Daisuke Kishio
 is a green hawk and the leader of the Babylon Rogues, and nicknamed the "Legendary Wind Master" due to his mastery of Extreme Gear. This mastery comes from his forefathers. His skills make him a possible match to Sonic the Hedgehog, whom he considers a rival. Jet is aware of his duties as leader but must sometimes be helped by his team. Filled with extreme pride, the thing he likes most other than treasure is himself. He despises losing and those who are faster or more confident than him and fights using Bashyo Fans. Jet is briefly mentioned in Sonic Frontiers.

Wave the Swallow

Voiced by:
English: Erica Schroeder (2006–2008), Kate Higgins (2010–present)Japanese: Chie Nakamura
 is a purple swallow who is the team's mechanic, as her father was for the previous generation of the Babylon Rogues. Gifted in this craft, she has a superb mechanical knowledge of Extreme Gear, which surpasses both Miles "Tails" Prower and Dr. Eggman. Because of this knowledge, she is full of confidence. She hates thick-headed or stupid people and notices everything, but her advice tends to be understandable only to her. Although she looks on Jet the Hawk as an "unreliable younger brother" and can be stubborn, she follows his leadership.

Storm the Albatross

Voiced by:
English: Dan Green (2006–2008), Travis Willingham (2010)Japanese: Kenji Nomura
 is a hulking albatross who is described as the muscle of the Babylon Rogues and Jet the Hawk's "right hand man." The strength of his loyalty to Jet is greater than any other and he hates rivals to the team. When he is angry, he becomes destructive; and the raw power of his physical strength makes up for his lower intelligence and lack of speed. With his quick temper, he may stutter when flustered, and he hates having to wait.

Silver the Hedgehog

Voiced by:
English: Pete Capella (2006–2009), Quinton Flynn (2010–2017), Bryce Papenbrook (2019–present)Japanese: Daisuke Ono
 is a silver-furred hedgehog from 200 years in the future of the main timeline. He first appeared in the 2006 Sonic the Hedgehog. His individual episode revolves around him traveling back in time with Blaze the Cat to find and slay Sonic the Hedgehog, who they believe is the cause of their world being destroyed in the future. Silver's primary ability is telekinesis; he is able to levitate objects and use them as projectiles to either defeat enemies, or interact with his environment. Like Sonic and Shadow, he transforms into his "super form" by using the power of the seven Chaos Emeralds.

Silver's creation was inspired by the game's early development stages, where the development team was making huge levels with multiple paths through them and decided they wanted to include a new character with unique abilities for an alternate way to play through the levels. The design team developed over fifty different concepts for the character. At one point he was to actually be an orange mink named Venice (named after the city of the same name), but the developers ultimately decided against this, fearing a mink would not blend in with the rest of the characters. They ended up deciding to make another hedgehog instead. 

Orange was originally decided for his fur, but they soon moved away from that in color, in favor of a white-gray one. While developing the character models and textures, they focused on using the hardware to develop the textures rather than just use white-gray, which lead to Silver's color and name. Additionally, Silver's backstory was inspired by Trunks from the 1984 - 1995 manga Dragon Ball, who made a similar journey to the past to kill two androids that would eradicate most of humanity in his own time; the script for Sonic the Hedgehog (2006) flat-out states "Essentially, think Trunks from Dragon Ball Z."

Since his first appearance in Sonic the Hedgehog (2006), he has mainly appeared in the Sonic series' spinoffs, multiplayer games, and small cameo roles. He is one of the playable characters in Sonic Rivals and Sonic Rivals 2, a playable character strictly in the multiplayer modes in Sonic and the Secret Rings and Sonic and the Black Knight, a playable racer in Sonic Riders: Zero Gravity, Sonic Free Riders and Team Sonic Racing, and a playable athlete in the Mario & Sonic series beginning with Mario & Sonic at the Olympic Winter Games. He appears in Sonic Generations as a boss in the stages Crisis City (console version) and Tropical Resort (3DS version). Additionally, Silver was one of a few Sega characters to make a cameo in Super Smash Bros. Brawl, in the background of Sonic's Green Hill Zone stage, and as a trophy and sticker.

The character has generally not been very well-received by critics.

Orbot and Cubot

Voiced by:
English: Kirk Thornton (Orbot), Wally Wingert (Cubot)Japanese: Mitsuo Iwata (Orbot), Wataru Takagi (Cubot)
 is a red robotic assistant of Dr. Eggman who first appears in Sonic Unleashed. While he generally assists in monitoring Eggman's data, he often makes sarcastic remarks pointing out general flaws in Eggman's plans, prompting a quick smack in return. He appears again in Sonic Colors, alongside a similar yellow robot named . Conversely to Orbot, Cubot is rather slow, not witty, and suffers from a defect in Sonic Colors that causes him to randomly speak with different accents. The two have continued to appear as assistants to Dr. Eggman in subsequent titles, such as Sonic Generations, Sonic Lost World and Sonic Forces. The duo made a cameo in Mario & Sonic at the London 2012 Olympic Games as one of the helping characters in the London Party, copying stickers for the participants. The duo appeared in Mario & Sonic at the Sochi 2014 Olympic Winter Games as the hosts of the Action and Answer Tour and in the Sonic Boom animated series. Digital Spy praised their inclusion in the plot of Sonic Colors, especially Cubot for his humorous observations and self-awareness about the game's tropes.

Wisps

Voiced by: Utako Yoshino
 are a race of extraterrestrial creatures who live on the grassy, lush planet called Planet Wisp. The mother of all Wisps is a much larger, pink one named Mother Wisp. She created Planet Wisp and raised all of her children. Wisps speak a common language that Sonic and Tails cannot understand, though Tails builds a translation device in the game Sonic Colors. Their Japanese and English name comes from Tails' translation of a word in their language; other characters in the game refer to them as "aliens". Wisps are composed of an energy force called "Hyper-go-ons", which they can use to phase into the body of playable protagonist Sonic and give him temporary elemental powers. They come in numerous breeds, each carrying one of many elemental powers known as "Color Powers". When Sonic collects a Wisp, he can use its power once at will; however, he can only carry one at a time.

There are numerous types of Wisps, each with its own special ability. Colors introduced ten types between the Wii and Nintendo DS versions of the game; some only appear in one version. For example, Purple Wisps, whose "Frenzy" ability turns Sonic into a difficult-to-control demon that can chomp through obstacles, is exclusive to the Wii version, but Violet Wisps, which scale up Sonic's density to black hole-like levels and causes him to absorb enemies, obstacles, and rings, appear only in the DS version. 

However, others appear in both versions, such as Yellow Wisps, which allow Sonic to drill underground and find otherwise inaccessible areas. Sonic Lost World introduced more types of Wisps while keeping some old types. Among these are Magenta Wisps, which bounce Sonic across paths of musical notes by having the player tap them on the Wii U's touch screen, and Black Wisps, which turn Sonic into a bomb that can roll over enemies and explode. The Colors manual describes each type of Wisp as having a different general personality; for example, Cyan Wisps, which allow Sonic to bounce off surfaces, are scatterbrained and energetic, while Orange Wisps, which blast him rapidly into the air, have fluctuating and explosive emotions.

In Sonic Colors, Eggman builds an amusement park spanning the Wisps' planets under the pretense of making up for past transgressions. Suspicious, Sonic and Tails investigate and rescue two Wisps from Orbot and Cubot. One of them, a talkative male White Wisp named Yacker, tags along with Sonic and Tails during the game. It turns out that Eggman is converting Wisps to a corrupted, purple (Wii version) or violet (DS version) state to fuel a mind control ray and control the universe. Sonic frees Wisps from their confines in each level, then uses several of them to defeat Eggman at the end of the game. 

However, Eggman's mind control cannon malfunctions and creates a black hole, which sucks Sonic in until the Wisps combine their power to pull him out and neutralize the black hole. Yacker frees the remaining Wisps, reverts them from their corrupted form, thanks Sonic and Tails, and leaves. The DS version features Mother Wisp as a post-game boss, as she was corrupted by the corrupted Wisps' Hyper-go-ons. Wisps have also appeared in the level "Planet Wisp" in Sonic Generations and the comics. Iizuka stated in an interview that the Wisps were added to Colors to "expand and strengthen the platform action gameplay" without forcing the player to switch to other playable characters. Another goal was to encourage players to revisit already-played levels; Sonic Team accomplished this by adding segments requiring certain types of Wisps to levels preceding their first appearances. Iizuka has said that he now considers them a staple in the Sonic series.

Critics have given mixed opinions toward Wisps and their integration into Sonic gameplay. IGN's Arthur Gies called them "the big addition" to Sonic Colors, outshining its polished physics and controls. Dave McComb of film magazine Empire called them "cutesy" and "strange", while John Meyer of Wired found them "cuddly" and Dale North of Destructoid called them "a cute little alien race". Randy Nelson from Joystiq called them "plush" and speculated that they could easily lend their image to profitable merchandise. 

Positive attention has been directed at the variety of Wisps available in Sonic Colors and Lost World and at the variety of gameplay styles they brought to the titles: for example, Gies stated that "almost all of them add interesting quirks to Sonic's basic abilities." Reviewing the Nintendo DS version of Colors, Tim Turi from Game Informer stated that "each adds an interesting new gameplay mechanic" to the game. Gies and Turi also praised the ability to revisit old levels with Wisps unlocked afterwards. Nintendo Powers Steve Thomason identified them as "a truly interesting addition to the Sonic formula" amidst a series of missteps, and praised their "cleverly designed" variety. Computer and Video Games writer Chris Scullion described Wisps in Lost World as "familiar power-ups that emulate mechanics in Mario's Wii adventures" as part of a larger, ambivalent point about the game being derivative of Super Mario Galaxy. 

However, control and pacing aspects of the Wisps in general, as well as of individual types, have been criticized: for example, Turi opined that "for almost every useful ability there is a complete dud" and bemoaned the Wii controls. Justin Speer from GameTrailers thought similarly and added that the Wisps "don't really feel like they belong". Hardcore Gamer Magazines review of Lost World stated that none of the Wisps make satisfying use of the Wii U's gamepad. Chris Shilling of Eurogamer found them to "lead to clumsy touchscreen or gyro interludes that kill a level's pacing."

Deadly Six
The Deadly Six are a group of six Zeti, a species that has the ability to manipulate magnetic fields. Their exact origins are unknown, but prior to the events of Sonic Lost World, Dr. Eggman had taken control of the group in order to capture animals to create Badniks. He controlled them and their powers with an item known as the Cacophonic Conch, which causes them great pain when he blows into it. However, when Sonic subconsciously kicks the Conch away from Eggman, they use their powers to control Eggman's Badniks, which prompted Sonic and Tails to reluctantly team up with Eggman to get past the Zeti and stop them. After turning on Eggman, they use his machine which was designed to suck the life out of the Earth and give it to themselves, making them stronger.

The members of the Deadly Six are:
Zavok (voiced by Patrick Seitz in English as of 2019 and Joji Nakata in Japanese), the strong, muscular, red-colored Zeti who acts as the group's leader. In his boss fights, he pilots a robotic dragon. He is the most recurring member of the Deadly Six, he commonly reappears in the Mario & Sonic series since 2016, and has reappeared in both Sonic Forces and Team Sonic Racing.
Zazz (voiced by Liam O'Brien in English and Yutaka Aoyama in Japanese), a lanky, pink-colored Zeti who is always ready for a fight. He pilots a Moon Mech, which has the ability to spit out stars. He reappears in Sonic Dash and the Mario & Sonic series.
Zomom (voiced by Patrick Seitz in English and Chafurin in Japanese), a gluttonous and dimwitted yellow-colored Zeti who is always seen eating.
Master Zik (voiced by Kirk Thornton in English and Mugihito in Japanese), an elderly, blue-colored Zeti who is skillful in martial arts. He is the founder of the Deadly Six and mentored Zavok in martial arts.
Zeena (voiced by Stephanie Sheh in English and Yumi Toma in Japanese), a green-colored Zeti who is the team's only female. She has many female related obsessions, such as painting her nails.
Zor (voiced by Sam Riegel in English and Yuki Tai in Japanese), a purple-colored Zeti who is always seen holding a blue rose. He has a very pessimistic and emo personality.

Characters in other media
Sally Acorn
Sally Acorn (voiced by Kath Soucie) is a red-haired brown chipmunk who appears as a major character in the 1993 [[Sonic the Hedgehog (TV series)|Sonic the Hedgehog animated series]] and later in the Archie Comics series. She has also made minor cameos in the Sonic Spinball game and in the Adventures of Sonic the Hedgehog animated series. In the animated series for which the character was created and also in the Archie Comics series she was depicted as a princess and leader of a group of freedom fighters, whose goal is to restore peace to the Kingdom of Acorn taken over by Robotnik. Sally is known for being Sonic's childhood friend and love interest, with Sally fighting alongside Sonic in many cases.

Chris Thorndyke
Christopher Thorndyke (voiced by Sanae Kobayashi in Japanese and Suzanne Goldish in English), usually called Chris, is the main human protagonist of the Sonic X animated series. He encounters and befriends Sonic shortly after his arrival in Chris's world, and invites him and his friends to stay in his home, joining them on their adventures to find the Chaos Emeralds and stop Eggman's robots.

The character has been divisive among fans. Writing for THEM Anime Reviews, Tim Jones called Chris an "uninspired" and "bland" protagonist.

Sticks the Badger
 (voiced by Nika Futterman in English and Aoi Yuki in Japanese) is an orange and brown badger, first introduced in the animated Sonic Boom television series. Her characteristics are wild, energetic and paranoid, having lived in the wilderness alone for most of her life. Nonetheless, she is portrayed as wanting to strengthen her newfound friendship with Sonic, Amy, Tails and Knuckles.

Sticks appears in a non-playable role in Sonic Boom: Rise of Lyric and as a playable character in Sonic Boom: Shattered Crystal.

She is described as "infantile" by Scott Thompson of IGN and an "unlikeable idiot" by Becky Cunningham of GamesRadar, albeit a "nice addition" by Chris Carter of Destructoid.

Sticks has appeared in other Sonic Boom titles, including Sonic Dash 2: Sonic Boom and Sonic Boom: Fire & Ice, and has appeared in other Sonic titles not associated with the Boom sub-series, such as Sonic Runners and Mario & Sonic at the Rio 2016 Olympic Games. She is mentioned in the mainline Sonic game Sonic Frontiers.

Notes

References

External links
 Character profiles on Sonic Channel (in Japanese)
 Character profiles on Sonic Central (archived)

 
Anthropomorphic video game characters
Sonic the Hedgehog